Bardinon is a surname. Notable people with the surname include: 

Alexandre Bardinon (born 2002), French-Swiss racing driver 
Pierre Bardinon (1931–2012), French businessman and collector of Ferrari cars